Andrés Alfonso Giménez Osorio (born September 4, 1998) is a Venezuelan professional baseball shortstop and second baseman for the Cleveland Guardians of Major League Baseball (MLB). He made his MLB debut with the New York Mets in 2020.

Career

New York Mets
Giménez signed with the New York Mets as an international free agent in July 2015. He made his professional debut in 2016 with the Dominican Summer League Mets and spent the whole season there, batting a combined .350 with three home runs, 38 RBIs, and a .992 OPS. In 2017, he played for the Columbia Fireflies where he slashed .265/.346/.349 with four home runs and 31 RBIs in 92 games.

Giménez was rated as the best Mets prospect after the 2017 season by Baseball America. He spent the 2018 season with both the St. Lucie Mets and the Binghamton Rumble Ponies, batting .281/.347/.409 with six home runs, 46 RBIs, and 38 stolen bases in 122 total games between the two clubs. That summer, he played in the 2018 All-Star Futures Game. He returned to Binghamton for the 2019 season, hitting .250/.309/.387 with nine home runs, 37 RBIs, and 28 stolen bases over 117 games.

Giménez was added to the Mets 40–man roster following the 2019 season.

Giménez made the Mets Opening Day roster in 2020, and made his Major League debut on July 24, 2020 at Citi Field as an eighth inning defensive replacement for Robinson Canó at second base. On July 29, Giménez made his first start, and recorded his first career hit off of Boston Red Sox pitcher Nathan Eovaldi, a single, in the second inning. In the sixth inning of the same game, Giménez tripled off Marcus Walden to record his first career RBI.

Giménez received a single vote in National League Rookie of the Year voting, tying him for seventh place with Ian Anderson and Sixto Sánchez. According to Statcast, his sprint speed was tied for fourth-fastest among Major League shortstops on the season.

Cleveland Indians / Guardians

On January 7, 2021, the Mets traded Giménez, Amed Rosario, Josh Wolf, and Isaiah Greene to the Cleveland Indians for Francisco Lindor and Carlos Carrasco. Giménez was the team's Opening Day starter at shortstop. Giménez struggled at the start of the season and was demoted to Triple-A on May 18.

In 2022 with the Guardians, Gimenez experienced a breakout season, batting .297 with 17 HRs and 69 RBIs. He was elected to the All Star Game at 2nd base and started as a replacement for the injured José Altuve. His reputation as a clutch hitter developed in 2022, as he had a 281 WRC+ in high leverage situations, meaning he hit 181% better than the average hitter in that position. Gimenez won a Gold Glove for his performance at 2nd base.

References

External links

1998 births
Living people
American League All-Stars
Binghamton Rumble Ponies players
Cleveland Guardians players
Cleveland Indians players
Columbia Fireflies players
Dominican Summer League Mets players
Gold Glove Award winners
Major League Baseball players from Venezuela
Major League Baseball shortstops
New York Mets players
Scottsdale Scorpions players
Sportspeople from Barquisimeto
St. Lucie Mets players
Venezuelan expatriate baseball players in the United States
Venezuelan expatriate baseball players in the Dominican Republic
2023 World Baseball Classic players